The Bob Dylan Center is a museum in Tulsa, Oklahoma, dedicated to the life and works of American singer-songwriter Bob Dylan.

The museum opened to the public on May 10, 2022.

In 2016, Dylan sold his archive to the Tulsa-based George Kaiser Family Foundation and the University of Tulsa. The foundation also operates the nearby Woody Guthrie Center, also located within the Tulsa Arts District.

References

External links 
 

Bob Dylan
2022 establishments in Oklahoma
Art museums established in 2022
Art museums and galleries in Oklahoma
Museums in Tulsa, Oklahoma
Biographical museums in Oklahoma
Music museums in Oklahoma